The term Concert Party may mean:

Concert party (business), a type of business takeover
Concert party (entertainment), a troupe of popular entertainers, usually travelling